Ferris Lowell Greenslet (June 30, 1875 in Glens Falls, New York – November 19, 1959 in Boston) was an American editor and writer.

Biography
Greenslet graduated from Wesleyan University in 1897, and earned both an M.S. and  the Ph.D. by Columbia University in 1900.  In 1901 he moved to Boston, where after working at the Boston Public Library and the "Boston Advertiser", he became an associate editor of the Atlantic Monthly, 1902–07. In 1910, he became a literary advisor and director of the Houghton Mifflin Co. publishing firm, continuing that employment for fifty-two years.

Ferris Greenslet wrote several biographies. He also wrote a collection of reminiscences, Under the Bridge published in 1943. He died in Cambridge, Massachusetts, on November 19, 1959

Bibliography
 1900 Joseph Glanvill – A Study in English Thought and Letters of the Seventeenth Century
 1903 The Quest of the Holy Grail
 1911 (1903) Walter Pater
 1905 James Russell Lowell: His Life and Work
 1908 Life of Thomas Bailey Aldrich
 1943 Under the Bridge: An Autobiography. Houghton Mifflin
 1945 (with Charles P. Curtis, Jr.). The Practical Cogitator: The Thinker's Anthology. Houghton Mifflin. 3rd Edition (1985) 
 1946 The Lowells and Their Seven Worlds. Houghton Mifflin

References
 
 Elihu Vedder Collection, University of Delaware Library, Newark, Delaware.

External links
 University of California: Letter from Ferris Greenslet to John Muir, 1910 Jun 9.

1875 births
1959 deaths
American biographers
American male biographers
American male journalists
American publishers (people)
Columbia University alumni
People from Glens Falls, New York
Wesleyan University alumni
Journalists from New York (state)
Historians from New York (state)